Paolo Aretino (1508-1584) or Paolo Antonio del Bivi was a Renaissance era Venetian composer known for sacred music. He was choirmaster of Arezzo Cathedral, and also wrote profane works, publishing two books of madrigals. He was also reported to have set sestinas by Petrarch.

Works
Selected works include:

Libro primo della madrigali cromati a 4
Deh dolce pastorella (no. 29)
Lament at ionii

References

Italian classical composers
Italian male classical composers
Renaissance composers
Musicians from Venice
1508 births
1584 deaths
16th-century Venetian people